The Sweordora were an Anglian  tribe who, according to the Tribal Hidage  lived in the vicinity of Sword Point, Whittlesey Mere, Cambridgeshire (formerly Huntingdonshire), probably in the 6th Century.  Their endonym is a clear cognate of the Suiones (also known as Swēon) the Swedes.

Notes

References

Peoples of Anglo-Saxon Mercia